Ray Kellogg (November 12, 1919 – September 26, 1981) was an American film and television actor. He was known for playing the role of Deputy Ollie in the American western television series The Life and Legend of Wyatt Earp.

Kellogg was born in Great Bend, Pennsylvania. He made his screen debut in 1942 with an uncredited role as a singer in the film Behind the Eight Ball. In 1951 he appeared in I'll See You in My Dreams, and in 1953 in the films She's Back on Broadway, So This Is Love, and Calamity Jane.

Later film appearances included The Miami Story (1954), The Court Jester (1955), My Gun Is Quick (1957), The Gunfight at Dodge City (1959), Raymie (1960), The Music Man (1962), Johnny Cool (1963), The Best Man (1964), Zebra in the Kitchen (1965),  Chamber of Horrors (1966), The Big Mouth and The Shakiest Gun in the West (1968). His final credit was for the 1971 film Chandler.

Kellogg died in September 1981 in Olympia, Washington, at the age of 61.

References

External links 

Rotten Tomatoes profile

1919 births
1981 deaths
People from Pennsylvania
Male actors from Pennsylvania
American male film actors
American male television actors
20th-century American male actors
Western (genre) television actors